Wally Niang (born June 5, 1996) is a Senegalese basketball player who last played for the Long Island Nets of the NBA G League.

Professional career
Niang went undrafted for the 2016 NBA Draft. On November 30, 2016, Niang was signed to the Long Island Nets, from the undrafted player pool. He scored 4 points, 4 rebounds and 1 assist in 15 minutes over the course of 5 games played.

References

External links
 Eurobasket.com profile
 RealGM profile

1996 births
Living people
BC Andorra players
Expatriate basketball people in Andorra
CB Estudiantes players
Liga ACB players
Long Island Nets players
Power forwards (basketball)
Senegalese expatriate basketball people in Spain
Senegalese expatriate basketball people in Sweden
Senegalese expatriate basketball people in the United States
Senegalese men's basketball players
Basketball players from Dakar